

The Comte AC-12 Moskito was a 1930s Swiss three-seat light touring cabin monoplane produced by Flugzeugbau A. Comte.

Design
The AC-12 was a high-wing cantilever monoplane with a fixed tailwheel landing gear. The enclosed cabin had a single seat forward for the pilot and a bench seat behind for two passengers. It was available fitted with a number of engines including the  Argus As 8 and  de Havilland Gipsy III inline engines or a  Armstrong Siddeley Lynx radial.

Specifications (with Argus engine)

References

Notes

Bibliography

See also

1930s Swiss civil utility aircraft
AC-12
Single-engined tractor aircraft